The Sablauskių Reservoir is a reservoir in Lithuania, in the Akmenė District Municipality. The shores are almost entirely covered in trees and bushes, with the shore itself being very winding. On the northern and eastern parts of the reservoir, there are forested areas. Around the reservoir there are many cultivated fields, a rural tourism homestead can be found here too.

History 
The Sablauskių Reservoir was created in 1975 for industrial water supply and in 2007 a 39 kW small hydroelectric power plant was built.

References 

Reservoirs in Lithuania
Akmenė District Municipality